Verdaccio is an Italian name for the mixture of black, white, and yellow pigments resulting in a grayish or yellowish (depending on the proportion) soft greenish brown. 

Verdaccio became an integral part of fresco painting, in which this color is used for defining tonal values, forming a complete monochromatic underpainting. Often architectural details in frescoes are left in verdaccio without any additional color layers; a notable example is the ceiling of the Sistine Chapel, where verdaccio underpainting can be clearly seen, left as it is on all architectural details of the composition.

In oil painting, a similar technique is used by Flemish painters, referred to as the "dead layer," is applied over the traditional bone colour (one part raw umber to one part yellow ochre) priming to refine the values and remove the warm tone of the primer. The resulting "white to olive green to black" underpainting is "like being illuminated by moonlight." It does not affect the tonality of the final painting.

External links
 WetCanvas!: Michael Georges: Underpainting - A primer for the new painter

Painting techniques